Lattimer is a village and census-designated place (CDP) in Hazle Township, Luzerne County, Pennsylvania, United States. The population was 554 at the 2010 census.

History
The Lattimer massacre took place in the village on September 10, 1897; it resulted in the deaths of at least 19 unarmed striking immigrant anthracite coal miners. The miners, mostly of Polish, Slovak, Lithuanian, and German ethnicity, were shot and killed by a Luzerne County sheriff's posse. Scores more were wounded. The massacre was a turning point in the history of the United Mine Workers (UMW).

Geography

Lattimer uses the Hazleton zip code of 18234.

Demographics

Notable people
Matt Broderick, former MLB player
Jack Palance, Academy Award-winning actor

References

Census-designated places in Luzerne County, Pennsylvania
Census-designated places in Pennsylvania